Sde Dov Airport (lit. Dov Field), also known as Dov Hoz Airport (Nemal HaTe'ufa Dov Hoz)  was an airport in Tel Aviv, Israel that mainly handled scheduled domestic flights to Eilat, northern Israel (Haifa and the Galilee), and the Golan Heights, as well as having served as a base for the Israeli Air Force (IAF). It was the largest airport in Tel Aviv proper, and the second largest in the area, after Ben Gurion Airport on the outskirts of Lod. The airport opened in 1938 and was named after Dov Hoz, one of the pioneers of Jewish aviation. It ceased operations on 30 June 2019 after a controversial, long-delayed plan came into effect to close the airport in order to build high-end residential apartments on its valuable beachfront property. Commercial flights were moved to Ben Gurion Airport and military flights were moved to other IAF bases. The airport was a focus city for Arkia Israel Airlines and Israir Airlines.

History

Early history 
In 1937, the mayor of Tel Aviv Israel Rokach asked the British mandate authorities for permission to create an airport in Palestine, promising to solve the transportation problem of Jews during the Arab revolt of 1936–39 when travelling from Tel Aviv through Arab territory to the main airport at Lydda, to catch Palestine Airways flights to Haifa, was difficult and dangerous. Works began on a plot of land north of the Yarkon River, Tel Aviv and when completed in October 1938, the airport served regular flights to Haifa, with the option of flights to Beirut. In 1940, the airport's name was changed to Sde Dov, in memory of Dov Hoz, one of the pioneers of Jewish aviation. Sde Dov was abandoned after Palestine Airways ceased operations in August 1940 and the site was used as a British Army base until December 1947 when with British permission the runway was reopened by the Haganah.

In the 1948 Arab-Israeli War, the airport served as a base to the Israeli Air Force. It was a central base, home to 21 aircraft at the time. The first military flight was made in December, 1947, when Pinchas Ben Porat flew an RWD-13 to Beit Eshel to rescue an injured soldier.

After the war 

Following the 1948 war the Arab orchards to the east of Tel Aviv were opened for development, and the military started using the Sde Dov airport on a regular basis. The airport regained its commercial operations, initially serving domestic flights, mostly to single customers, on Piper Cub aircraft. It later expanded operations to scheduled service on larger aircraft to various parts of Israel. As a result of the land availability, an additional, north–south, runway was built with no opposition. By 1960, land in Tel Aviv became scarce, and the municipality demanded that the airport be relocated northward, so as to allow residential development in its place. However, a committee that investigated in 1961 the options for such a relocation found no feasible site in proximity to Tel Aviv and suggested that flights be moved to Lod airport (now known as Ben Gurion Airport), and that road access from Tel Aviv to Lod be improved. This option, however, was blocked by the Israel Defense Forces.

The government set up a second committee in 1968 who suggested that the old east–west runway be closed and the airport's area reduced, allowing for development to the east of the airport. They suggested that this is replaced by a new runway in the sea, adjacent to the beach. The runway was closed, and a high density upper-middle income neighborhood was built to the east of the airport, although the new runway was never constructed due to the high cost involved.

As the new residential area suffered from aircraft noise, residents joined in the demand that the airport be relocated. Despite this, the number of flights to the airport increased as the newly formed Israel Airports Authority strived to reduce congestion at Ben Gurion Airport by shifting all domestic turbo-prop flights to Sde Dov. Once again, the only feasible alternative proposed at this point was to build a runway in the sea and again, the high cost of this project meant that it never happened. This was a large issue in the area during the whole of the 1980s.

Recent history and closure 
The early 1990s saw a rapid rise in land values in the Tel Aviv area following the massive immigration wave from the former Soviet Union and the rapid economic growth fueled by Israel's subsequent hi-tech boom. This brought the issue of relocation back to light. Despite this, however, in 1997, Sde Dov was declared an International Airport for private flights. 

The issue remained unresolved until late 2006 when it was announced that the airport would be vacated to make way for residential redevelopment. The plan to close the airport was strongly opposed by the Tel Aviv and Eilat municipalities, and its implementation was postponed numerous times until the airport finally closed on 30 June 2019. By 31 July 2019, a Caterpillar 950M loader started the first phase of removing the runway and within days the runway was unrecognizable.

The airport prior to closure 
Sde Dov Airport mostly handled domestic flights within Israel, as well as general aviation activity and limited international flights, mostly to nearby Cyprus. The airport had two terminals. The IAF took up about 40% of overall movements (take-offs and landings), and used the airport as a base for some of its operations, as well as a convenient hub for military and government passenger traffic. Due to its location in the centre of Israel, air-force and civilian pilots alike crossed the airspace controlled by Sde Dov's air traffic control tower from north to south and vice versa in order to reach their destination, without landing at Sde Dov. This significantly increased the air traffic density above and around the airport, and efforts were made to keep "crossing traffic" away from the approach and departure patterns in order to minimise their effect on air traffic safety at Sde Dov. The airport had seven check-in desks and 45 aircraft stands.

The former airport site after closure
In early 2020 the Israeli Defense Ministry completed demolition of the old airport structures ahead of redevelopment. The former tower was left standing and will remain as a historic preserved building. As the former Eilat Airport also shut down in 2019, Israel has the opportunity to redevelop two centrally located former airport sites in growing cities going into the 2020s. Criticizing the plans for redevelopment as overly focused on luxury apartments, the Israeli newspaper Haaretz called the planned housing "premium homes that only Israel's landed gentry can buy".

Airlines and destinations 
As of July 2019, the airport no longer serves any traffic. Prior to its closure, both Arkia and Israir Airlines operated scheduled services out of the airport. The airport primarily served domestic flights to Haifa Airport and Eilat Airport.

See also 
 Meigs Field – a centrally located airport in Chicago whose closure was likewise controversial
 Eilat Airport – closed the same year as Sde Dov for similar reasons

References

External links 
Sde Dov Airport
Aerial view of Dov Hoz Airport
History of Sde Dov Airport

External links
 Official website

1938 establishments in Mandatory Palestine
2019 disestablishments in Israel
Airports established in 1938
Airports disestablished in 2019
Airports in Israel
Buildings and structures in Tel Aviv
Israeli Air Force bases
Transport in Tel Aviv
Defunct airports in Israel
World War II sites in Mandatory Palestine